

A 

 Adrian Adgar
 Dave Akam
 Caroline Alexander
 Eddie Alexander
 Ian Alsop
 Katie Archibald
 Lizzie Armitstead
 Dan Atherton
 Gee Atherton
 Rachel Atherton
 George Atkins
 Brenda Atkinson

B 

 David Baker (cyclo)
 David Baker (track)
 Ian Banbury
 Lizzy Banks
 Alan Bannister
 Charley Barden
 Cyril Bardsley
 Elinor Barker
 Megan Barker
 Yanto Barker
 Alice Barnes
 Hannah Barnes
 Nick Barnes
 Reg Barnett
 Ella Barnwell
 Sid Barras
 Tom Barras
 Mark Barry
 Charles Henry Bartlett
 Karl Barton
 Lauren Bate
 Edward Battell
 Phil Bayton
 Scott Beaumont
 Oli Beckinsale
 Dave Bedwell
 Lauren Bell
 Mark Bell
 Jonathan Bellis
 Michael Bennett
 Steve Bent
 Frederick Thomas Bidlake
 Lloyd Binch
 Janet Birkmyre
 Laura Bissell
 Peter Bissell
 Maria Blower
 Anna Blyth
 Adam Blythe
 Chris Boardman
 John Gavin Bone
 Fred Booker
 Ray Booty
 Peter Boyd
 Sally Boyden
 Reg Braddick
 Bill Bradley
 Lisa Brambani
 Matt Brammeier
 Mark Bristow
 Stan Brittain
 Rhys Britton
 Peter Brotherton
 Josh Bryceland
 Stewart Brydon
 Trevor Bull
 Donald Burgess
 Steven Burke
 Bruce Bursford
 Beryl Burton
 Denise Burton
 Germain Burton
 Maurice Burton
 Keith Butler
 Jon-Allan Butterworth

C 

 Hugh Cameron
 Ian Cammish
 Craig Campbell
 Ernest J. Capell
 Sophie Capewell
 Paul Carbutt
 Jack Carlin
 Manon Carpenter
 Hugh Carthy
 Cyril Cartwright
 Mark Cavendish 
 Ernest Chambers
 Stanley Chambers
 Anna Christian
 Mark Christian
 Ed Clancy
 Jon Clay
 Ernie Clements
 Ron Coe
 Mark Colbourne
 Katie Colclough
 Gary Coltman
 Jenny Copnall
 Craig Cooke
 Geoff Cooke (cyclist)
 Nicole Cooke
 Simon Cope
 Phil Corley
 Kadeena Cox
 Sydney Cozens
 Nick Craig
 Jessica Crampton
 Matthew Crampton
 Bruce Croall
 Robin Croker
 Roy Cromack
 Steve Cronshaw
 Ernie Crutchlow
 Kate Cullen
 Steve Cummings
 Jody Cundy
 Paul Curran
 Katie Curtis

D 

 Stuart Dangerfield
 David Daniell
 Karen Darke
 Ann Davey
 Charlie Davey
 Emma Davies
 Sally Dawes
 Lizzie Deignan
 Vin Denson
 Abigail Dentus
 Josie Dew
 Anna Docherty
 Owain Doull
 Dean Downing
 Russell Downing
 Bob Downs
 Alex Dowsett
 Tony Doyle
 Adam Duggleby

E 

 Harry Earnshaw
 Ray Eden
 Ross Edgar
 Josh Edmondson
 Phil Edwards
 Malcolm Elliott
 Kian Emadi
 Alf Engers
 Neah Evans
 Rik Evans
 Wendy Everson

F 

 Neil Fachie
 Andrew Fenn
 Paul Fennell
 Sid Ferris
 Dan Fleeman
 David Fletcher
 Brian Fleming
 Billie Fleming
 Des Fretwell
 Chris Froome

G 

 Trevor Gadd
 Mike Gambrill
 Grace Garner
 Lucy Garner
 John Geddes
 Alan Geldard
 Tao Geoghegan Hart
 Harry Genders
 Tony Gibb
 Tommy Godwin (1912)
 Tommy Godwin (1920)
 Maggie Gordon-Smith
 Lydia Gould
 Tim Gould
 Tony Gowland
 Harry Grant
 Eileen Gray
 Walter Greaves
 Alex Greenfield
 Ben Greenwood
 Phil Griffiths
 Freddie Grubb
 James Gullen

H 

 Corrine Hall
 Ian Hallam
 Roger Hammond
 William Hammond
 Denise Hampson
 David Handley
 Nikki Harris
 Reg Harris
 Bert Harris
 Derek Harrison
 Sam Harrison
 William Harvell
 Danny Hart
 Rob Hayles
 Hamish Haynes
 Matthew Haynes
 Ethan Hayter
 Rachel Heal
 Steve Heffernan
 Charles Helps
 Simeon Hempsall
 Cyril Heppleston
 John Herety
 Tony Hewson
 Gary Hibbert
 Tony Hibbert
 Ernest Higgins
 Amy Hill
 Harry Hill
 Philip Hindes
 Bert Hitchen
 Barry Hoban
 Sally Hodge
 Jenny Holl
 Charles Holland
 Dale Holmes
 Joe Holt
 Cyril Horn
 Dennis Horn
 Ciara Horne
 Kristian House
 Wendy Houvenaghel
 Chris Hoy
 Megan Hughes
 Arthur Humbles
 Jeremy Hunt
 Joshua Hunt
 Angela Hunter
 Ellen Hunter
 Michael Hutchinson

I 
 Matt Illingworth
 Les Ingman
 Joby Ingram-Dodd

J 

 Harry Jackson
 Peter Jacques
 Becky James
 Rachel James
 Tony James
 Rob Jefferies
 Paul Jennings
 Ernest Johnson
 Maxine Johnson
 Thomas Johnson
 Victor Johnson
 Charline Joiner
 Benjamin Jones
 Emma Jones
 Graham Jones
 Hayley Jones
 Louise Jones
 Mandy Jones
 Ray Jones
 Steve Joughin

K 

 Anthony Kappes
 Emily Kay
 Ronald Keeble
 John Keen
 Frederick Keeping
 Peter Kennaugh
 Tim Kennaugh
 Darren Kenny
 Jason Kenny
 Laura Kenny
 Dannielle Khan
 Liam Killeen
 Charles King
 Dani King
 Clarence Kingsbury

L 

 Thomas Lance
 Paul Lasenby
 Annie Last
 Christopher Latham
 Jack Lauterwasser
 Maria Lawrence
 Chris Lawless
 Sharon Laws
 Dave Le Grys
 Colin Lewis
 Marco Librizzi
 Phil Liggett
 Dennis Lightfoot
 Simon Lillistone
 Chris Lillywhite
 Arthur Linton
 Daniel Lloyd
 Dave Lloyd
 Manon Lloyd
 Harry Lodge
 Mark Lovatt
 Christian Lyte

M 

 Bob Maitland
 Anthony Malarczyk
 Paul Manning
 Greg Mansell
 Katy Marchant
 Lucy Martin
 Tony Mayer
 Hannah Mayho
 Craig MacLean
 James McCallum
 Charlie McCoy
 Ruth McGavigan
 Aileen McGlynn
 Yvonne McGregor
 Paul McHugh
 Donald McKellow
 Shaun McKeown
 Daniel McLay
 Joey McLoughlin
 Alwyn McMath
 Mark McNally
 Paul Medhurst
 Leonard Meredith
 Arthur Metcalfe
 Jimmy Michael
 John Middleton
 Stanley Miles
 David Millar
 Robert Millar
 Dave Miller
 John Miller
 Ruby Miller
 Ernie Mills
 Glen Mitchell
 Peter Mitchell
 David Mixell
 James Moore
 Willi Moore
 Oliver Moors
 Rachel Morris
 Charles Moss
 Jon Mould
 Paula Moseley
 Tracy Moseley
 Faith Murray
 Stephen Murray
 Rob Muzio

N 

 Emily Nelson
 George Newberry
 Frances Newstead
 Alan Newton
 Chris Newton
 Dave Nie
 Jon Norfolk

O 
 Graeme Obree
 Evan Oliphant
 Lewis Oliva
 James Ouchterlony
 Ryan Owens

P 

 Kieran Page
 Rob Partridge
 Bill Paul
 Julie Paulding
 Steve Paulding
 Ernest Payne
 Hannah Payton
 Steve Peat
 Cyril Peacock
 Craig Percival
 William Perrett
 Liam Phillips
 Sarah Phillips
 Victoria Pendleton
 Alison Pockett
 Dick Poole
 Emma Pooley
 Hugh Porter
 Huw Pritchard
 Peter Procter
 Jack Pullar

Q 
 Jason Queally

R 

 Jacob Ragan
 Dave Rand
 Dave Rayner
 Shanaze Reade
 Hannah Rich
 Evie Richards
 Simon Richardson (English cyclist) 
 Simon Richardson 
 David Ricketts
 Amy Roberts
 Jessica Roberts
 Brian Robinson
 Desmond Robinson
 Eileen Roe
 Rebecca Romero
 Matt Rotherham
 Dave Rowe
 Luke Rowe
 Matthew Rowe
 Guy Rowland
 Erick Rowsell
 Joanna Rowsell
 Val Rushworth
 Harry Ryan

S 

 Gary Sadler
 Ross Sander
 Liz Scalia
 Max Sciandri
 Helen Scott
 Ian Scott
 Anna Shackley
 Robin Sharman
 James Shaw
 Julia Shaw
 Norman Sheil
 Eileen Sheridan
 Paul Sherwen
 John Sibbit
 Tom Simpson
 Don Skene
 Callum Skinner
 Andy Slater
 Brian Smith
 Jeff Snodin
 Frank Southall
 Monty Southall
 Tom Southam
 Jamie Staff
 George Herbert Stancer
 Ian Stannard
 Bryan Steel
 Ian Steel
 Matthew Stephens
 David Stevenson
 Mark Stewart
 David Stone
 Ronald Stretton
 Anthony Stirrat
 Barney Storey
 Sarah Storey
 Colin Sturgess
 Ben Swift
 Bernadette Swinnerton
 Catherine Swinnerton
 Paul Swinnerton
 Glen Sword
 Sara Symington
 Melanie Szubrycht

T 

 Charlie Tanfield
 Harry Tanfield
 John Tanner
 Bryan Taylor
 James Taylor
 Andy Tennant
 Geraint Thomas
 Gordon Thomas
 Eric Thompson
 Robert Thompson
 Andy Tennant
 Jonathan Tiernan-Locke
 Adrian Timmis
 Terrence Tinsley
 Jane Tomlinson
 Neville Tong
 Emma Trott
 Joseph Truman
 John Tudor
 Hamish Turnbull

U

V 
 Jessica Varnish
 Graham Vines

W 

 Chris Walker
 Jessie Walker
 Shaun Wallace
 Matthew Walls
 Jon Walshaw
 Michelle Ward
 Rob Warner
 Jerry Waters
 Wilfred Waters
 Dave Watkins
 Paul Watson
 Graham Webb
 Ken Webb
 Lorna Webb
 Darryl Webster
 Les West
 Jayne Westbury
 Charlie Wegelius
 Roger Whitfield
 Geoff Wiles
 Bradley Wiggins
 Ian Wilkinson
 Alan Williams
 Jeff Williams
 Russell Williams
 Victoria Williamson
 Arthur James Wilson
 Drew Wilson
 John Wilson
 Leslie Wilson
 Marguerite Wilson
 Spencer Wingrave
 Julian Winn
 Rebecca Womersley
 Oliver Wood
 John Woodburn
 Fred Wright
 Michael Wright
 Harry Wyld
 Lew Wyld
 Percy Wyld
 Helen Wyman

Y 
 Adam Yates
 Sean Yates
 Simon Yates

See also
 List of British cyclists who have led the Tour de France general classification
 List of Dutch cyclists

 
Cyclists
Lists of cyclists